"Snakes on a Plane (Bring It)", also referred to as "Bring It (Snakes on a Plane)", is the debut single by Cobra Starship, released in 2006 as the main single from the soundtrack to the film Snakes on a Plane. In addition to Cobra Starship vocalist Gabe Saporta, the song features William Beckett of The Academy Is..., Travie McCoy of Gym Class Heroes, and Maja Ivarsson of The Sounds. Before being written specifically for the film, the song was titled "Bring It".

Music video
The video, directed by Lex Halaby, shows McCoy, Ivarsson, Saporta and Beckett walking through Honolulu International Airport, acting as if they were villains hired by Eddie Kim (the antagonist of Snakes on a Plane) sneaking snakes on board in their suitcase and guitar case. They are able to pass through security when Ivarsson distracts the airport worker by taking off her jacket. Pete Wentz of Fall Out Boy makes a cameo appearance (at 1:46), talking on a payphone nervously as the band members pass ominously. Samuel L. Jackson (who plays Neville Flynn, the main protagonist of the movie) also makes a cameo appearance, lowering his shades and eyeing the band members as they pass, unaware of the true contents inside their cases before returning to his 100 Bullets comic. He is also seen wearing the unofficial Snakes on a Plane T-shirt designed by webcomic artist Jeffrey Rowland (with snakes flying a plane). The video ends with a sign for South Pacific Airlines Flight 121 as the band boards the plane, the same flight as in the film.

The video was filmed in Burbank, California.

Charts

References

External links

Film theme songs
2006 debut singles
2006 songs
American pop punk songs
Cobra Starship songs
Fueled by Ramen singles
Travie McCoy songs
Song recordings produced by S*A*M and Sluggo
Songs written by Sam Hollander
Songs written by Dave Katz
Songs written for films